Matyáš Jachnicki (born 16 May 1999) is a Czech volleyball player, a member of the club VK Kladno.

References

External links
 Kladno.Volejbal profile
 Volleybox profile
 CEV profile

1999 births
Living people
Czech men's volleyball players